Alexander James Murphy OBE (born 22 April 1939) is an English former professional rugby league footballer, and coach of the mid to late 20th century. Known as 'Murphy the Mouth' (or "Yapper" by some referees) and regarded as one of the greatest halfbacks in the history of the British game, he represented Great Britain in 27 Tests and his club career was played at three clubs, St. Helens, Leigh and Warrington. Murphy assumed a player-coach role of the last two clubs and expanded his coaching role toward the end of his playing career to include clubs such as Wigan, Salford and Huddersfield. He later returned to both Warrington and Leigh respectively as a football manager. He was the first player to captain three different clubs to victory in the Challenge Cup Final .

Background

Born in St. Helens, Lancashire on 22 April 1939, Murphy was brought up in Thatto Heath, and at ten years of age had played in both the junior and senior XIIIs at St Austin's School.

Playing career
Murphy had received town and county schoolboy honours by the time he signed with his native St. Helens for £80 on his 16th birthday in 1955. The signing itself was almost akin to a military operation. St. Helens representatives smuggled Murphy 'under cover' to a nearby house until the clock struck midnight to signal Murphy's 16th birthday, and his eligibility to sign professional terms. He was coached from an early age by Jim Sullivan. During his national service Murphy played rugby union for the Royal Air Force, frequently playing for an Air Force team the same week as playing rugby league for St. Helens.

St. Helens

Murphy began his career at St. Helens playing reserve team rugby (known then as the 'A' team). After several "A" team games, Murphy demanded a place in the first team. This demand was refused and so he promptly demanded a transfer. The dispute was settled and Murphy's first team début was against Whitehaven at Knowsley Road.

Murphy's career at St. Helens went on to be long and successful. While still a teenager, he was selected to tour Australasia with the Great Britain side in 1958, becoming the youngest touring player at the time, and helping Great Britain to victory in the famous second Test in which they were down to ten men. He scored 21 tries in 20 appearances on that tour.

He won the Championship with St. Helens in 1958–59 season. The following year he played in Great Britain's World Cup-winning side. With his club he claimed the Challenge Cup in 1961.

On the 1962 Ashes tour he suffered a shoulder injury which caused him to miss three months of the domestic season and there was some speculation he would never play again. On this tour he scored 9 tries in 11 appearances.

Murphy became the first British rugby league footballer to have two testimonial matches. They were at St. Helens in 1965, and at Warrington in 1976.

Alex Murphy played right-, i.e. number 3, and scored a conversion in St. Helens' 35–12 victory over Halifax in the Championship Final during the 1965–66 season at Station Road, Swinton on Saturday 28 May 1966, in front of a crowd of 30,165.

Alex Murphy played , and scored a try in St. Helens' 12–6 victory over Wigan in the 1961 Challenge Cup Final during the 1960–61 season at Wembley Stadium, London on Saturday 13 May 1961, in front of a crowd of 94,672, and played right-, i.e. number 3, and scored a conversion in the 21–2 victory over Wigan in the 1966 Challenge Cup Final during the 1965–66 season at Wembley Stadium, London on Saturday 21 May 1966, in front of a crowd of 98,536.

Alex Murphy played  in St. Helens' 2–12 defeat by Oldham in the 1958 Lancashire County Cup Final during the 1958–59 season at Station Road, Swinton on Saturday 25 October 1958, played  in the 4–5 defeat by Warrington in the 1959 Lancashire County Cup Final during the 1959–60 season at Central Park, Wigan on Saturday 31 October 1959, played  in the 15–9 victory over Swinton in the 1960 Lancashire County Cup Final during the 1960–61 season at Central Park, Wigan on Saturday 29 October 1960, played , and scored a try in the 25–9 victory over Swinton in the 1961 Lancashire County Cup Final during the 1961–62 season at Central Park, Wigan on Saturday 11 November 1961, played  in the 15–4 victory over Leigh in the 1962 Lancashire County Cup Final during the 1962–63 season at Station Road, Swinton on Saturday 26 October 1963, and played  in the 12–4 victory over Swinton in the 1962 Lancashire County Cup Final during the 1964–65 season at Central Park, Wigan on Saturday 24 October 1964.

Alex Murphy played  in St. Helens' 0–4 defeat by Castleford in the 1965 BBC2 Floodlit Trophy Final during the 1965–66 season at Knowsley Road, St. Helens on Tuesday 14 December 1965

Leigh

Murphy left St. Helens to become player-coach at Leigh because he was unhappy at being moved to the s to accommodate the signing of Tommy Bishop. As the 1966–67 season began, Murphy declined to play for St. Helens. The Australian club, North Sydney indicated their interest in signing him. At the end of September, Murphy submitted a written transfer request to the St. Helens board who accepted it, putting him on the list at £12,000.

North Sydney tabled a bid of £8,000 for Murphy which was accepted. However, at the last minute, Murphy agreed to a 5-year deal with Leigh to become the highest paid coach in the Rugby Football League.

Murphy's first game in charge of his new team was against his former club in a league match at Hilton Park. Murphy's Leigh overcame a depleted St. Helens side by 29–5. Murphy later recounted in an issue of the Rugby Leaguer some 20 years later that:

"It never entered my mind to leave Saints in the first place. But events took over and there was a lot of pride involved on both sides and the situation reached the stage where a parting of the ways became inevitable."

Alex Murphy played , and was the coach, and was man-of-the-match winning the Lance Todd Trophy in Leigh's 24–7 victory over Leeds in the 1971 Challenge Cup Final during the 1970–71 season at Wembley Stadium, London on Saturday 15 May 1971, in front of a crowd of 85,514. This was a match where Murphy's ability to attract controversy was once again exemplified. He was involved in an altercation with Leeds' Syd Hynes which resulted in Hynes being sent off for headbutting Murphy. Murphy was carried off the pitch on a stretcher, but later returned to the bench and was able to lift the trophy at the end of the game.  Over the years, tales of Murphy winking to his teammates as he was carried from the field have endured, and Hynes always maintained his innocence.

Alex Murphy played , and scored a conversion in Leigh's 2–11 defeat by Swinton in the 1969 Lancashire County Cup Final during the 1969–70 season at Central Park, Wigan on Saturday 1 November 1969, and played  in the 7–4 victory over St. Helens in the 1970 Lancashire County Cup Final replay during the 1970–71 season at Station Road, Swinton on Saturday 28 November 1970.

Alex Murphy played , and was the coach in Leigh's 5–8 defeat by Castleford in the 1967 BBC2 Floodlit Trophy Final during the 1967–68 season at Headingley Rugby Stadium, Leeds on Saturday 16 January 1968, and played , was the coach, and scored a conversion in the 11–6 victory over Wigan in the 1969 BBC2 Floodlit Trophy Final during the 1969–70 season at Central Park, Wigan on Tuesday 16 December 1969.

Warrington

Murphy left Leigh shortly afterwards to become player-coach at Warrington. Murphy won one Great Britain cap while at Warrington. In 1973 a 20-match unbeaten run in the league helped Warrington win the League Leader's Trophy. The 1973–74 season was the most successful at Warrington, with the club winning the Challenge Cup, Captain Morgan trophy, John Player trophy and Club Merit trophy. The highlight was when Murphy coached, captained and played  in Warrington's 24–9 victory over Featherstone Rovers in the 1974 Challenge Cup Final during the 1973–74 season at Wembley Stadium, London on Saturday 11 May 1974, in front of a crowd of 77,400. He was again the coach in the 7–14 defeat by Widnes in the 1975 Challenge Cup Final during the 1974–75 season at Wembley Stadium, London on Saturday 10 May 1975, in front of a crowd of 85,998, but missed playing in the match through injury, retiring as a player shortly after but remaining as coach of the club until 1978. During his time as the Warrington coach, his old rivals, Widnes succeeded in reaching another Challenge Cup final in 1976, their opponents being St. Helens. Murphy caused controversy by declaring that he would jump off the Silver Jubilee Bridge and into the River Mersey if Widnes won; luckily, Widnes were defeated 20 points to 5 and Murphy managed to keep his feet on dry land.

Alex Murphy was the coach in Warrington's 0–0 draw with Salford in the 1974 BBC2 Floodlit Trophy Final during the 1974–75 season at The Willows, Salford on Tuesday 17 December 1974, and in the 5–10 defeat by Salford in the 1974 BBC2 Floodlit Trophy Final replay during the 1974–75 season at Wilderspool Stadium, Warrington on Tuesday 28 January 1975.

Alex Murphy was the coach in Warrington's 4–0 victory over Featherstone Rovers in the 1973–74 Captain Morgan Trophy Final during the 1973–74 season at The Willows, Salford on Saturday 26 January 1974, in front of a crowd of 5,259.

Coaching career

Upon retirement, Murphy built upon the experience he had acquired as a player-coach by taking up the reins as a full-time coach. He was co-coach of England with Bill Oxley during the 1975 World Series.

After Warrington, Murphy was appointed to high-profile roles at Salford (May 1978 to November 1980),Leigh (1980 to 1982) where in 1982 he guided Leigh to the Division 1 championship and Lancashire cup winners, before taking the role of coach of Wigan in 1982. There, he led them to victory in the John Player Trophy in 1983, and took them to the Challenge Cup Final in 1984, where they lost to Widnes. He left at the start of the next season, following a row with vice chairman Maurice Lindsay.

In 1988 Murphy was an inaugural inductee into the Rugby League Hall of Fame.

He took over as coach of St. Helens in 1986, taking them to Wembley Stadium, London in 1987, against Halifax, and again in 1989 where they played Wigan. St Helens lost by one point to Halifax, and were humiliated by Wigan in an error-ridden performance two years later, losing 27–0, becoming the first side ever held scoreless in a Challenge Cup Final at Wembley. During the last 10 minutes of the Challenge Cup Final, St. Helens received a penalty that was well within kicking range for either of their goal kickers, Great Britain international Paul Loughlin, and Australian dual international Michael O'Connor. Knowing that no side had ever been held scoreless in a Cup Final at Wembley and not wanting his St. Helens to be the first, Murphy frantically gestured from the sideline to team captain Paul Vautin to take the kick at goal despite the scoreline. Vautin ignored Murphy's instructions and instead the ball was kicked into touch for a tap restart. Wigan's defense held firm though and St. Helens last scoring opportunity was lost. This led to tension between Murphy and Vautin for a number of years until they worked together for the Australian Nine Network during television coverage of The Ashes series during the 1994 Kangaroo tour.

In 1991, he joined Huddersfield: within a year, promotion to the Second Division had been achieved.

After a six-year absence from rugby league, Murphy returned to the game in 2003 as football director of Leigh after the National League One club sacked coach Paul Terzis.

Post-retirement
In 1998 Murphy was awarded the OBE for services to the game of rugby league. In 2000 his autobiography, Saint and Sinner was published. Murphy was also employed as a commentator by BBC television for a number of years working alongside long-time league commentators Eddie Waring, and later former dual rugby international Ray French. He also worked for Australia's Nine Network as an expert commentator during the 1994 Kangaroo tour.
He was also employed to write opinion columns for newspapers such as the Daily Mirror, and the Manchester Evening News. One was known as 'Murphy's Mouth.' In 2006 he became Chairman of Oxford Cavaliers rugby league club. Murphy is an inductee in both the St Helens RFC Hall of Fame, and the Warrington Wolves RLFC Hall of Fame.

References

External links
(archived by web.archive.org) Alex Murphy at rugbyleaguehistory.com
Alex Murphy at eraofthebiff.com
 https://web.archive.org/web/20060507140342/http://www.rlhalloffame.org.uk/murphy.htm
Profile at saints.org.uk
 http://www.timesonline.co.uk/article/0,,9910-1134312_2,00.html
 http://www.saintsrlfc.com/
 http://www.oxfordrl.com

1939 births
Living people
England national rugby league team coaches
England national rugby league team players
English rugby league coaches
English rugby league players
Great Britain national rugby league team players
Huddersfield Giants coaches
Lancashire rugby league team coaches
Lancashire rugby league team players
Lance Todd Trophy winners
Leigh Leopards captains
Leigh Leopards coaches
Leigh Leopards players
Officers of the Order of the British Empire
Royal Air Force airmen
Royal Air Force rugby union players
Rugby league five-eighths
Rugby league halfbacks
Rugby league players from St Helens, Merseyside
Salford Red Devils coaches
St Helens R.F.C. coaches
St Helens R.F.C. players
Warrington Wolves captains
Warrington Wolves coaches
Warrington Wolves players
Wigan Warriors coaches